Lisa de Cazotte  (November 2, 1961 – December 7, 2019) was an American soap opera producer.

Biography
Born Lisa Smith in Westchester, New York, de Cazotte was the daughter of Charles and Beatrice Smith and grew up in Dobbs Ferry, New York. A graduate of Fordham University, de Cazotte was known as Lisa S. Hesser before her marriage to French documentary producer Antoine de Cazotte.

De Cazotte started as an intern at the daytime soap opera One Life to Live in 1983, working her way up to Associate Producer and then Coordinating Producer. She served as a producer on Santa Barbara from 1991 to 1993, coordinating producer on All My Children from 1994 to 1996, and supervising producer on Sunset Beach from 1997 to 1999. De Cazotte was then the executive producer of Passions for its entire run, from July 5, 1999 to August 7, 2008. She next became the executive producer of General Hospital: Night Shift for its second season in 2008. De Cazotte returned to All My Children as a producer under Julie Hanan Carruthers from 2009 to 2010. She also served as co-executive producer of Days of Our Lives from January 30, 2012 to July 31, 2015. On December 19, 2017, she joined The Young and the Restless as a supervising producer.

Positions held
 One Life to Live: Associate Producer (1987–1989)
 One Life to Live: Coordinating Producer (1989–1991)
 Santa Barbara: Producer (1991–January 15, 1993)
 All My Children: Coordinating Producer (1994–1996)
 Sunset Beach: Supervising Producer (1997–1999)
 Passions: Executive Producer (July 5, 1999 – August 7, 2008)
 General Hospital: Night Shift: Executive Producer (Season two, July 22, 2008 – October 21, 2008)
 All My Children: Producer (February 2, 2009–January 2010)
 Days of Our Lives: Co-Executive Producer (January 30, 2012 – July 31, 2015)
 The Young and the Restless: Supervising Producer (December 19, 2017 – September 21, 2018; February 20, 2019 – 2019)

Awards and nominations

Executive producing history

References

External links
 

1961 births
2019 deaths
People from Westchester County, New York
Soap opera producers
Television producers from New York (state)
American women television producers
21st-century American women